Hrachik Babayan (born 1 August 1996) is an Armenian sports shooter. He competed in the men's 10 metre air rifle event at the 2016 Summer Olympics.

References

1996 births
Living people
Armenian male sport shooters
Olympic shooters of Armenia
Shooters at the 2016 Summer Olympics
Place of birth missing (living people)
Shooters at the 2014 Summer Youth Olympics
European Games competitors for Armenia
Shooters at the 2015 European Games
Shooters at the 2019 European Games